

The Hindustan Ardhra was a sailplane designed in India for pilot training by the government's Civil Aviation Department in the late 1970s as the ATS-1 Ardhra. It was a two-seat aircraft of conventional configuration and wooden construction. The Indian Air Force ordered fifty examples in the early 1980s to be produced by Hindustan Aeronautics and the type was approved for use for flying by cadets.

Operators

 Indian Air Force

Specifications

References

Further reading
 
 

1970s Indian sailplanes
Glider aircraft
Ardrha
Ministry of Civil Aviation (India)
Aircraft first flown in 1979